Joseph John Zapustas (July 25, 1907 – January 14, 2001) was a professional baseball player. He appeared in two games in Major League Baseball as an outfielder for the Philadelphia Athletics during the 1933 Philadelphia Athletics season. He had one hit in five at bats. He also played for the New York Giants of the NFL in 1933.

After retiring from football and baseball in 1939, Zapustas taught science and mathematics at high school, along with coaching the Quincy Manets semi-professional football team. Zapustas also became a boxing referee, officiating in bouts featuring Rocky Marciano, Joe Louis and Sugar Ray Robinson. Zapustas was the Director of Recreation for Randolph, Massachusetts between 1951 and 1991, and was honoured in 1998 by the local ice hockey rink being renamed the Joseph J. Zapustas Arena.

References

External links

1907 births
2001 deaths
Sportspeople from Liepāja
People from Courland Governorate
Baseball players from Boston
Beckley Black Knights players
Boston Shamrocks (AFL) players
Fordham Rams baseball players
Fordham Rams football players
Latvian emigrants to the United States
Latvian people of Lithuanian descent
Latvian players of American football
Major League Baseball players from Latvia
Major League Baseball outfielders
New York Giants players
Philadelphia Athletics players
Players of American football from Boston
Toledo Mud Hens players
Williamsport Grays players
Zanesville Greys players